William Francis Bailey, Sr., (June 20, 1842April 5, 1915) was an American lawyer, jurist, and Democratic politician.  He was the 6th and 10th mayor of Eau Claire, Wisconsin, and served six years as a Wisconsin circuit court judge.  During the American Civil War, he served as a Union Army officer in the New York volunteer infantry.

Early life
Bailey was born on June 20, 1842, in Carmel, New York, son of Benamin Bailey, a lawyer. Bailey came to Eau Claire in 1867 at the age of 25.

Career
During the American Civil War, he served with the Union Army, enlisting as a corporal with the 38th New York Infantry Regiment, he was later commissioned as a captain in the 95th New York Infantry Regiment.

After serving as district attorney of Eau Claire County, Wisconsin, Bailey served as the sixth and tenth mayor of Eau Claire, elected in 1877, 1882, and 1883. In 1890, he was a candidate for the United States House of Representatives from Wisconsin's 8th congressional district. He lost to incumbent Nils P. Haugen. Bailey later served as a state district court judge from the 17th circuit from 1892 to 1898. He was a Democrat.

Personal life
He married twice. His first wife, Mercy, died in 1882. Bailey's second wife, Frances, died in 1943.

Electoral history

Wisconsin Circuit Court (1876)

| colspan="6" style="text-align:center;background-color: #e9e9e9;"| General Election, April 4, 1876

U.S. House of Representatives (1890)

| colspan="6" style="text-align:center;background-color: #e9e9e9;"| General Election, November 4, 1890

Wisconsin Circuit Court (1891, 1897)

| colspan="6" style="text-align:center;background-color: #e9e9e9;"| General Election, April 7, 1891

| colspan="6" style="text-align:center;background-color: #e9e9e9;"| General Election, April 6, 1897

References

|-

People from Carmel, New York
Mayors of Eau Claire, Wisconsin
Wisconsin Democrats
Wisconsin lawyers
People of New York (state) in the American Civil War
People of Wisconsin in the American Civil War
Union Army officers
Union Army soldiers
1842 births
1915 deaths
19th-century American politicians
19th-century American lawyers